Hoppaw (Yurok: Ho'opeu) is an unincorporated community in Del Norte County, California. It appears in the Requa U.S. Geological Survey Map.

References

External links
 

Unincorporated communities in California
Unincorporated communities in Del Norte County, California